The knockout stage of the 1966 FIFA World Cup was the second and final stage of the competition, following the group stage. The knockout stage began on 23 July with the quarter-finals and ended on 30 July 1966 with the final match, held at Wembley Stadium in London. The top two teams from each group (eight in total) advanced to the knockout stage to compete in a single-elimination style tournament. A third place play-off also was played between the two losing teams of the semi-finals.

England won the final 4–2 against West Germany for their first World Cup title.

All times listed are local time.

Qualified teams
The top two placed teams from each of the four groups qualified for the knockout stage.

Bracket

Matches

England vs Argentina

|valign="top" width="50%"|

|}

West Germany vs Uruguay

|valign="top" width="50%"|

|}

Soviet Union vs Hungary

|valign="top" width="50%"|

|}

Portugal vs North Korea

|valign="top" width="50%"|

|}

Semi-finals

West Germany vs Soviet Union

|valign="top" width="50%"|

|}

England vs Portugal

|valign="top" width="50%"|

|}

Third place play-off

|valign="top" width="50%"|

|}

Final

References

External links
 1966 FIFA World Cup archive
 FIFA World Cup 1966 Technical Study

1966 FIFA World Cup
1966
England at the 1966 FIFA World Cup
Uruguay at the 1966 FIFA World Cup
West Germany at the 1966 FIFA World Cup
Argentina at the 1966 FIFA World Cup
Portugal at the 1966 FIFA World Cup
Hungary at the 1966 FIFA World Cup
Soviet Union at the 1966 FIFA World Cup
North Korea at the 1966 FIFA World Cup